The Mountain States Telephone Building (also known as Telephone Building) is a historic building located at 931 14th Street in Denver, Colorado.  It was listed on the National Register of Historic Places on January 26, 2005.

It served as the headquarters of the Mountain States Telephone & Telegraph Company, later known as Mountain Bell. Constructed in a variant of the Gothic Revival style named "Modern American Perpendicular Gothic," the building was designed by local architect William N. Bowman. The new building, completed in 1929, was built to provide dial telephone service for the first time in Denver.

It is a 15-story building with buff-colored terra cotta, on a pink granite base.  According to its NRHP nomination, the "Mountain States Telephone and Telegraph Company, the building's original owner, called its architectural style 'Modern American Perpendicular Gothic,' referring to its setbacks, massing, vertically, and Gothic Revival style ornamentation." The Gothic Revival architecture of the Mountain States Telephone Building is featured on many of Denver's Architectural tours. 

The entrance of the building features 13 murals from the history of telecommunications by Allen Tupper True, which were painted in 1929. The murals are located at several of the entrance lobbies and in one location inside the building.

See also
 Mountain States Telephone and Telegraph Company Building (Miles City, Montana)

References

External links

 Telecommunications Virtual Museum: 931 14th St: Historic Building, Virtual Tour

National Register of Historic Places in Denver
Gothic Revival architecture in Colorado
Office buildings completed in 1929
Office buildings in Denver
Lumen Technologies
Telephone exchange buildings
Telecommunications buildings on the National Register of Historic Places
Commercial buildings on the National Register of Historic Places in Colorado